USS Swallow is a name used more than once by the United States Navy:

  was laid down at New York City on 18 March 1918.
  was laid down on 19 July 1941 at Alameda, California.
 , a minesweeper commissioned on 22 June 1944.

References 

United States Navy ship names